Oz Terra is the unofficial name given to a major geological region on Charon. The Pluto-facing hemisphere of Charon is divided onto two primary regions; Oz Terra in the north and Vulcan Planum in the south. These regions are separated by a series of scarps near Charon's equator. The region was discovered by New Horizons during its flyby of Pluto in July 2015.

Geology
Oz Terra sits about a kilometer higher than Vulcan Planum, and is typified by large crustal blocks, having fractured early in Charon's history. The region was formed about 4 billion years ago, when a subsurface ocean of water and ammonia flowed to the surface, and then solidified.

See also
 List of geological features on Charon

References

New Horizons